The 2015 Women's World Open Squash Championship is the women's edition of the 2015 World Championships, which serves as the individual world championship for squash players.

It was originally scheduled to take place in Kuala Lumpur, Malaysia from December 11 to 18, 2015; with less than two weeks' notice, the event was deemed to have been cancelled after the event promoters allegedly cited "security fears" as justification for doing so. In response, Minister of Youth and Sports Khairy Jamaluddin claimed the event's cancellation was down to the promoters' failure to attract sponsorship and accused them of attempting to blackmail the Malaysian government with a demand for event funding (including RM3.5 million ($850,000) for private security arrangements) as a result.

Upon settling an agreement with the new event promoters, the PSA confirmed the tournament was rescheduled to take place at the National Squash Centre between 25 and 30 April 2016 inclusive. It is the second time in three editions the tournament has been held after its designated year.

Nour El Sherbini won her first World Championship title, beating Laura Massaro in the final.

Prize money and ranking points
For 2015, the prize purse was $185,000. The prize money and points breakdown is as follows:

Seeds

Draw and results

See also
World Championship
2015 Men's World Open Squash Championship

References

External links
World Championship 2015 website

World Squash Championships
Women's World Open Squash Championship
Squash tournaments in Malaysia
International sports competitions hosted by Malaysia
2015 in Malaysian women's sport
Sport in Kuala Lumpur
2015 in women's squash